Quan Chi is a fictional character in the Mortal Kombat fighting game franchise by Midway Games/NetherRealm Studios. He first appeared in the main series with Mortal Kombat 4 (1997) following appearances in the non-canonical animated series Mortal Kombat: Defenders of the Realm (1996) and the action-adventure spin-off Mortal Kombat Mythologies: Sub-Zero (1997). A malevolent sorcerer from the Netherrealm, he is usually featured as a supporting villain in the franchise. Quan Chi also serves as one of the two primary villains in Mortal Kombat: Deadly Alliance (2002), alongside Shang Tsung, as the eponymous Deadly Alliance. The character has orchestrated several events throughout the series, including the murder of Scorpion's family and clan.

Outside of the games, Quan Chi has appeared in various additional media, including the syndicated series Mortal Kombat: Conquest (1998–1999) and the web series Mortal Kombat: Legacy (2011–2013). Reception to the character has been mostly positive in respect to his role as one of the franchise's overarching villains.

Appearances

In video games
In the events of both Mortal Kombat Mythologies: Sub-Zero and Mortal Kombat 4 (1997), nefarious free-roaming sorcerer and necromancer Quan Chi assists disgraced former Elder God Shinnok—who had been banished to the Netherealm by the thunder god Raiden after centuries of warring—in defeating the realm's then-ruler Lucifer in exchange for power and the opportunity to co-rule the realm at Shinnok's side. After another sorcerer, Shang Tsung, reveals the location of Shinnok's long-lost amulet, Quan Chi attempts to retrieve it, only to encounter its four elemental guardians, so he proposes a deal with the Lin Kuei clan of assassins: he would destroy their rivals, the Shirai Ryu, in exchange for the assistance of one of their warriors, Sub-Zero. Quan Chi convinces Sub-Zero and Shirai Ryu warrior Hanzo Hasashi to find a map leading to the amulet's location in the hopes of having them meet in combat, with the Lin Kuei assassin succeeding in killing his rival before retrieving the map. True to his word, Quan Chi eliminated the Shirai Ryu before sending Sub-Zero to find the amulet itself. Once he succeeded, Sub-Zero returned the amulet to Shinnok, though they were both unaware that it was a fake and that Quan Chi kept the genuine article for himself. Sub-Zero later defeated the sorcerer and sent him into exile before stealing the fake amulet from Shinnok. After reviving Hasashi as the undead revenant Scorpion, Quan Chi told him that Sub-Zero killed his clan and family. Once Scorpion defeats his rival however, Quan Chi reveals his involvement in killing the revenant's family before attempting to banish him to the Netherrealm, only for Scorpion to take the sorcerer with him. In Mythologies, Quan Chi was assisted by Sareena, Kia, and Jataaka; members of the Brotherhood of the Shadow who served as his personal assassins. In his non-canonical ending in MK4, Quan Chi turned against Shinnok and destroyed him with his own amulet.

Quan Chi returned in Mortal Kombat: Deadly Alliance (2002) as part of the titular group. After escaping from Scorpion with the assistance of the Oni Drahmin and Moloch, Quan Chi abandoned his rescuers and fled to the other dimension Outworld; coming across a mummified army of the dormant Dragon King Onaga. Quan Chi brokers a deal with Shang Tsung for his assistance in reviving Onaga's army in exchange for a supply of souls that would preserve Shang Tsung's youth, then eliminate evil Outworld emperor Shao Kahn and the perennial Mortal Kombat champion Liu Kang. Together with the assistance of Onaga's soldiers, the Deadly Alliance kills Raiden's chosen defenders and defeat Raiden himself. The partnership dissolves however when Shang Tsung attempts to steal Shinnok's amulet to take control of Onaga's army for himself. While Quan Chi tries to stop him, Onaga suddenly arrives to take the amulet for himself. To stop the Dragon King, Raiden unleashed his godly energy in a violent explosion, seemingly killing the Deadly Alliance.

In Mortal Kombat: Armageddon (2006), Quan Chi attempts to acquire the godlike power of the elemental Blaze (the game's final boss). During the battle royal among the combatants on the Pyramid of Argus in the game's opening cinematic sequence, Quan Chi wounds Kenshi in battle before Shang Tsung (disguised as Ermac) throws him off the pyramid. In the game's Konquest Mode, he suggests that he, Shang Tsung, Shao Kahn and Onaga work together to defeat the forces of good, but is secretly serving as a double agent for Shinnok.

Though Quan Chi was not part of the first generation of Mortal Kombat fighting games, he was the only playable character from the three-dimensional era included in both the storyline and immediate roster of the 2011 Mortal Kombat reboot, which retells the first three games' stories as part of a new continuity. In the game's story mode, Quan Chi first appears at the start of the Shaolin Tournament with the resurrected Scorpion serving as his personal assassin. Scorpion has entered the tournament to seek revenge against Sub-Zero, whom he believes slaughtered his family and clan. Raiden, in his effort to prevent Armageddon, convinces him not to after defeating him in combat, but Quan Chi manipulates Scorpion into doing the deed by showing him a vision of the Lin Kuei warrior murdering his clan and family. He and Scorpion join forces in the tournament to face the Shaolin monk Liu Kang, but both are defeated. During the second tournament in Shao Kahn's Outworld arena, Quan Chi and Shang Tsung join forces to battle Kung Lao but are defeated. Quan Chi later revives the deceased Queen Sindel in order to enable Shao Kahn to invade Earthrealm, in addition to resurrecting Sub-Zero as Noob Saibot to assist him in his plans. With Quan Chi entrenched as Shao Kahn's second-in-command, the emperor eliminates Shang Tsung and transfers his powers to Sindel, while Quan Chi constructs a Soulnado to take every soul on Earth. However, Native American warrior Nightwolf defeats Quan Chi in battle and kicks Noob Saibot into the Soulnado to destroy it, though Quan Chi escapes. After Sindel massacres the Earthrealm warriors assembled to stop Shao Kahn's takeover, Raiden seeks cooperation between Earth and the Netherealm by offering Quan Chi their souls as compensation, but Quan Chi has already acquired them and transformed into his revenant slaves. However, he inadvertently causes Shao Kahn's downfall when he reveals the Elder Gods are obligated to stop the tyrant for failing to honor Mortal Kombat's rules. Raiden kills Shao Kahn and halts his invasion, but Quan Chi makes preparations for Shinnok's invasion; leading Netherrealm's forces in attacking the weakened Earthrealm and Outworld.

In Mortal Kombat X (2015), Quan Chi has built an army of revenants from the fallen Earthrealm warriors to aid him in retrieving Shinnok's amulet over the course of two years. Though he succeeds in doing so with the aid of D'Vorah, he is decapitated by the resurrected Hasashi once he learned the sorcerer conspired with the Lin Kuei ninja Sektor to kill the Shirai Ryu.

Quan Chi makes non-playable appearances in the beat 'em up spinoff title Mortal Kombat: Shaolin Monks (2005), and in the story mode for the crossover fighting game Mortal Kombat vs. DC Universe (2008). Midway had planned to add Quan Chi to MKvsDC as downloadable content, but he was removed late in the process due to Midway's financial issues despite Boon's announcement at the time that the character was "almost done."

Character development

Quan Chi became an instantly ubiquitous presence in the franchise following his first appearances in MK Mythologies: Sub-Zero and Mortal Kombat 4, which were both released in North America in October 1997. He was the centerpiece of print-media advertising for MK Mythologies that featured the tagline "Meet the root of our evil", while Mortal Kombat co-creator and programmer Ed Boon described MK4 as "the Quan Chi show". In Midway's attempt to use MK4 as a means of reintroducing the series to fans while enabling the machine to stand out in arcades, a large image of Quan Chi was displayed on both sides of the game's cabinet. Actor and martial artist Richard Divizio (Kano, Baraka, and Kabal in the two-dimensional games) portrayed the character in both installments. 

Designed by Mortal Kombat co-creator John Tobias, Quan Chi's original design that was first seen in the 1996 animated series and then MK Mythologies and MK4, is as a bald figure with an albino skin tone and black eye makeup, and who wears a teal bodysuit under a black tabard adorned with ornamental spikes on the shoulders and accented by a yin-yang symbol on the sternum. For Deadly Alliance, the first release following Tobias' 2000 departure from Midway, Quan Chi's design was minimized with his going shirtless, revealing an extensive collection of red tattoo-like markings on his body and an elliptical red gem on his forehead, in addition to a minimal black palette with Shinnok's amulet on his belt. In conceptual sketches by Deadly Alliance character designer Allen Ditzig, Quan Chi wielded a staff topped with a head carving that shot green mist and flies from its mouth, a concept that was instead used in the creation of Drahmin, whose offense included firing flies at his opponent.

NetherRealm Studios character artist Solomon Gaitan initially referenced actor Yul Brynner when digitally sculpting Quan Chi's facial features for Mortal Kombat X. Gaitan said that series art director Steve Beran "wanted me to merge Bela Lugosi and Boris Karloff’s features" during the design process, in addition to researching vultures: "I wanted him to feel like he was in a permanent state of lurking and stalking; waiting for death to happen."

Gameplay
Alex Vo of GameSpy considered Quan Chi's special moves in Mortal Kombat: Armageddon to be "decent", but his Escrima fighting style could lead into "lengthy attacks which ... can take out more than 20% of a life bar." Quan Chi was unlockable in MK2011 after completing the story mode; Mitchell Saltzman of GameFront described Quan Chi therein as capable of "frustrating players with his long, drawn out, and damaging combos", while his "Sky Drop" teleportation attack was best used against opponents who overused projectiles. Prima Games considered Quan Chi to be one of the weakest characters in the reboot, with at least half of their test matches with him won against just three other characters, for a poor 38% overall victory rate. Bryan Dawson of Prima Games listed Quan Chi in his 2014 selection of the "cheapest" Mortal Kombat characters, as he had "80-percent-damage combos if [players] land a hit and have enough [life] meter to burn." In Mortal Kombat X, Quan Chi has three distinct gameplay variations along with the other characters.

Quan Chi's Fatalities (a finishing move that executes defeated opponents) received opposing reception from the Midway staff. In MK4, he tears off his opponent's leg at the hip and then beats them repeatedly with the bleeding limb as the screen fades to black for the next match. Another, from Deadly Alliance, has him leap onto his beaten opponent's shoulders and then pull their head upward, stretching their neck to an impossible length. In a 2006 interview, Boon deemed it his least-liked finisher but called the "Leg Beatdown" his favorite. Lead series storyteller John Vogel explained that the "Neck Stretch" was instantly disliked but the developers were forced to leave it in Deadly Alliance due to time constraints. Sound designer Dan Forden cited the finisher as an example of the development team at the time "getting a little low on creativity".

Other appearances

Television and film

One year before his first video game appearances, Quan Chi made his Mortal Kombat series debut in one episode of the 1996 animated series Mortal Kombat: Defenders of the Realm as an independent sorcerer searching for a magical gem with evil powers until his plans are thwarted by the Earthrealm heroes. He was voiced by Nick Chinlund.

He was to make a cameo at the end of the 1997 feature film Mortal Kombat: Annihilation that was cut in post-production. An on-set photograph of the character in full costume was nonetheless published in the December 1997 issue of Sci-Fi Entertainment.

Quan Chi was a featured character in a special-edition tie-in comic book that was included with the 1998 PC home release of Mortal Kombat 4.

Quan Chi appeared in four episodes of Mortal Kombat: Conquest (1999), and was played by Adoni Maropis. His duties therein involved conspiring with Shang Tsung to defeat the series' lead characters (Kung Lao, Siro and Taja), while in one episode, Shang Tsung disguises himself as Quan Chi in his attempt to assassinate Shao Kahn. In a 2006 interview, Maropis explained that while he was indifferent to the MK franchise, he got into his character after his makeup was applied, a process that took two hours. Maropis additionally designed a vocal tone for his role that he claimed the series' producers were initially against as they wanted him to lower the character's onscreen intensity, but eventually relented and later allowed Maropis to rerecord his dialogue: "They let me be and let it all hang out."

Quan Chi makes a brief appearance in the 2011 web series Mortal Kombat: Legacy, at the climax of a two-part episode featuring Sub-Zero and Scorpion. He kills Hanzo Hasashi's family under the guise of Bi-Han (Sub-Zero), then resurrects Hanzo as an undead specter and promises him revenge against Sub-Zero in exchange for his services. Quan Chi was played by Michael Rogers, who enthused in a 2011 interview that he "absolutely loved the role" despite not having played the games, but once he got the part he avoided any kind of MK media aside from the 2010 short film Mortal Kombat: Rebirth, because he "did not want any influences and wanted to come in with a fresh perspective" on the character.

In the animated film Mortal Kombat Legends: Scorpion's Revenge (2020), Quan Chi (voiced by Darin De Paul) serves as one of the two main antagonists with Shang Tsung, and resurrects Hanzo Hasashi to turn him into Scorpion and employ him as his servant for eternity.

Reception

Characterization and gameplay
Quan Chi was ranked fourteenth in UGO Networks' 2012 list of the top fifty Mortal Kombat characters, for his role as one of the "prime villains" of the series. Ben Richardson of GameFront said of the character in 2011, "He’s Scorpion’s boss—pretty much the ultimate badass credential." Complex named Quan Chi second behind only Shang Tsung as the series' most brutal character: "He's MK's root of all evil, having a hand in just about every villain's scheme." Den of Geek rated Quan Chi 26th in their 2015 ranking of the franchise's 73 playable characters, calling him "the true evil mastermind of the MK universe" who "suffers from the writers trying to make him a little too slick and smart for his own good." In 2010, Game Informer named Quan Chi as a character they wanted for the reboot: "Many of the characters introduced post-MK3 were forgettable, but Quan Chi stood out as one of the more interesting." However, Nic Rowen of Destructoid gave a harsher opinion of the character: "Quan Chi is a dark sorcerer shitbag that nobody likes, both in the fandom and in the series' narrative [for] unsuccessfully scheming behind the back of whatever master he is currently serving like an incompetent, bald Starscream."

Finishing moves
Most of Quan Chi's Fatalities have been well-received. GamesRadar considered it one of their "ten greatest things about Mortal Kombat" in a 2007 feature. Richardson ranked it as the sixth-best finishing move in the series, though he described it as "blue-collar and non-magical." Prima Games included the "Leg Beatdown" at #43 in their 2014 list of the series' top fifty Fatalities. Bloody Disgusting's Bill Frye ranked the "no-nonsense" finisher seventh in his list of the top ten series Fatalities, and Luke Brown of Arcade Sushi rated it sixth in his 2014 selection of the series' ten "gnarliest" Fatalities. Cameron Koch of TechTimes ranked it ninth out of the ten best finishers in the franchise's history in 2015 for its dark humor value.

However,  David Saldana of 1UP.com ranked the "Neck Stretch" from Deadly Alliance the worst Fatality. Hardcore Gaming 101 commented, "One highlight [of the game] in particular is Quan Chi's Fatality, but only because of how incredibly stupid it is." James Deaux of Earth-2.net deemed it the "lamest" finisher ever: "In a series where people have their heads blown up, ripped off, sliced in half, torched, melted, and even eaten whole, the producers of the games felt that Quan Chi should one-down them by ... stretching their neck out an extra three feet."

Other reception
Topless Robot called the inclusion of Quan Chi in Defenders of the Realm as "the only contribution to [the] franchise that this series made." However, Nathan Adams of Film School Rejects said in his review of the eighth episode of Legacy, "It’s not clear by watching this episode who Quan Chi is; they don’t even mention his name", while adding that he "had to do some digging around ... so that I could understand what was happening" in regards to the plot. Quan Chi has gained attention for his physical resemblance to God of War character Kratos, who was added to the PlayStation 3 version of MK2011 as a guest character. Brett Elston of GamesRadar remarked, "[A]shy white skin, red markings, shoulder guards...and Quan Chi's got about eight years on Kratos."

Notes

References

Demon characters in video games
Extraterrestrial characters in video games
Fictional martial artists in video games
Fictional Tang Soo Do practitioners
Fictional cult leaders
Fictional eskrimadors
Fictional mass murderers
Fictional necromancers
Fictional swordfighters in video games
Fictional tricksters
Male characters in video games
Male video game villains
Mortal Kombat characters
Video game antagonists
Video game bosses
Video game characters introduced in 1996
Video game characters who can teleport
Video game characters who use magic